Óscar Pereiro Sío (born 3 August 1977) is a Spanish former professional road bicycle racer. Pereiro was declared the winner of the 2006 Tour de France, after the original winner Floyd Landis was disqualified for failing a doping test after his stage 17 victory. Pereiro is a former member of Porta da Ravessa (2000 to 2001), Phonak Hearing Systems (2002 to 2005),  (2006 to 2009), and the  cycling team (2010). After retiring from cycling in 2010, Pereiro joined his local part-time football club Coruxo FC of the Segunda División B.

Early career
Pereiro placed tenth in the 2004 Tour de France, 22 minutes 54 seconds behind original winner Lance Armstrong, who was subsequently disqualified. He was awarded the Most Aggressive Rider Award in the 2005 Tour de France after powering the winning breakaways in Stages 15, 16 and 19. He was the Stage 16 winner - just edging out Spain's Xabier Zandio, Italy's Eddy Mazzoleni and Australia's Cadel Evans. His efforts on Stage 15, the toughest stage of the Tour, were highly admired by the peloton. He finished second that day to Discovery Channel's George Hincapie after "pulling" for most of the final climb up the Pla D'Adet. In January 2014, Pereiro confessed on a radio show he sold this stage to Hincapie, making the deal some kilometers before arriving to the finish line.

Pereiro was considered a leader on Phonak along with Landis and Santiago Botero in 2005 - his last year riding for the team.

2006 Tour de France
His breakaway Stage 13 second-place finish (just behind Germany's Jens Voigt) gained him almost 30 minutes on most of the General classification leaders and propelled him into an unexpected yellow jersey. He traded the overall lead back and forth with Floyd Landis over the next few days before finally losing it to him for good on the second to last day of the Tour.

After hearing of Landis' positive "A" test, Pereiro stated that it was only an initial, unconfirmed result and he would not yet consider Landis guilty or himself the Tour winner. "I have too much respect for Landis to do otherwise", he said. After hearing that the Landis "B" test also came back positive, Pereiro stated that he now considers himself Tour champion and the Landis scandal should not diminish his own achievement. "Right now I feel like the winner of the Tour de France", Pereiro said. "It's a victory for the whole team."

On 20 September 2007 Landis was found guilty of doping and ordered that he forfeit his 2006 Tour de France victory, making Pereiro the official winner, but not before Pereiro had his own small doping issue (see the next section for more details).

Doping investigation

On 18 January 2007, French newspaper Le Monde reported that Pereiro had returned an "Adverse Analytical Finding" (AAF) during the 2006 Tour de France. It is alleged that a concentration of salbutamol in excess of the threshold of the allowed therapeutic use was found in two urine samples, produced after stages 14 (Montélimar - Gap, in which Pereiro finished 26th) and 16 (Bourg-d'Oisans - La Toussuire, 3rd place). In the latter stage, Pereiro retook the yellow jersey from Landis.

Salbutamol is commonly used to treat asthma symptoms, and is allowed to be used in cycle racing if the cyclist can provide a medical prescription for the substance. It is alleged that the International Cycling Union gave Pereiro retroactive permission to use the substance on medical grounds after the positive tests. The French anti-doping agency questions the veracity of the medical grounds. It demanded that Pereiro verify the grounds for the use of salbutamol within a week.

On 25 January 2007, France's anti-doping agency dropped its investigation, saying Pereiro provided sufficient justification for use of the asthma medication.

Crash in 2008 Tour de France
On 20 July, during the 15th stage of 2008 Tour de France, Pereiro crashed at the 89 kilometre mark over a guardrail just prior to a hairpin turn during the descent of the Col Agnel landing on the other side of the turn, which meant the end of the Tour for him. Initially, he was thought to have broken his femur and arm, but later it was learned that this was not the case. He suffered a broken arm but never lost consciousness and was taken to a nearby hospital in Cuneo. During this Tour, Pereiro was working for  team captain Alejandro Valverde but when it became clear in the Pyrenees that Valverde had lost too much time, he and Valverde managed to maintain placings in the top 20 riders.

Football career
In December 2010 Pereiro announced that he signed with Segunda División B club Coruxo FC. He said that it was his childhood dream to become a professional footballer. Playing as a winger, he made two appearances for the team that season, scoring twice.

Career achievements

Major results

1998
 1st  U23 Cyclo-Cross Champion
1999
 1st  U23 Cyclo-Cross Champion
2001
 1st Stage 3 Grande Premio
2002
 1st Stage 5 Setmana Catalana de Ciclisme
2003
 1st Stage 6 Tour de Suisse
2004
 1st Classique des Alpes
 10th Overall Tour de France
2005
 1st Prologue Tour de Romandie
 10th Overall Tour de France
1st Stage 16
 Combativity award Overall
2006
 1st  Overall Tour de France
2007
 1st Stage 1 (TTT) Volta Ciclista a Catalunya
 2nd Overall Tour du Limousin
 10th Overall Tour de France
2008
 3rd Road race, National Road Championships

Grand Tour general classification results timeline

* After the disqualification of Floyd Landis

References

External links

1977 births
Living people
Cyclists from Galicia (Spain)
Footballers from Galicia (Spain)
Spanish footballers
Association football wingers
People from Vigo (comarca)
Sportspeople from the Province of Pontevedra
Spanish Tour de France stage winners
Tour de France winners
Tour de Suisse stage winners
Spanish male cyclists